Royal Air Force Blenheim Crescent (RAF Blenheim Crescent) is a non-flying Royal Air Force station, in Ruislip, in Greater London, England, presently used by the United States military for administration.

Units
The site was originally leased to the United States Navy but transferred to the United States Air Force in October 2007. The primary units assigned to the base are branch offices of the European Office of Aerospace Research and Development, US Army International Technology Center Atlantic, the Office of Naval Research Global, the Naval Criminal Investigative Service, the Joint NATO National Support Element, the Defense Energy Support Center and the Fleet Industrial Supply Center. After the base underwent renovation, personnel from the U.S. Navy, U.S. Army, and U.S. Air Force relocated there, alongside civilian staff and contractors. The base also became home to a small number of Canadian Forces personnel.

RAF Blenheim Crescent has no RAF personnel present, and is commanded by an officer of the U.S. Air Force at the rank of colonel.

References

Royal Air Force stations in London
Installations of the United States Air Force in the United Kingdom
Buildings and structures in the London Borough of Hillingdon
History of the London Borough of Hillingdon
Military history of Middlesex